Chahwa is an administrative ward in the Dodoma Urban district of the Dodoma Region of Tanzania. In 2016 the Tanzania National Bureau of Statistics report there were 4,744 people in the ward, from 4,365 in 2012.

References

Dodoma
Wards of Dodoma Region